The Living Sea: Soundtrack from the IMAX Film is the soundtrack album accompanying the IMAX film The Living Sea. The album was recorded by Sting and Steve Wood. It features several songs previously released by Sting, as well as new compositions by Sting and Wood.

It also features the guitar duo Strunz & Farah, as session musicians.

Track listing
All songs written by Sting, except as noted.

Credits
Sting – performer
Alan Deremo – bass guitar
Tim Landers – bass guitar
Ardeshir Farah – guitars
Michael Hamilton – guitars
Jorge Strunz – guitars
Brent Lewis – ikauma drums
Nate Wood – drums
Daniel May – orchestration
Kevin Ricard – percussion
Michito Sanchez – percussion
Marc Russo – saxophone
Beth Wood – voices
Steve Wood – synthesizer, voices

References

Sting (musician) soundtracks
Documentary film soundtracks
Albums produced by Hugh Padgham
1995 soundtrack albums
A&M Records soundtracks